Phialacanthus is a genus of flowering plants belonging to the family Acanthaceae.

Its native range is the Eastern Himalayas and Peninsula Malaysia.

Species
Species:

Phialacanthus griffithii 
Phialacanthus major 
Phialacanthus minor 
Phialacanthus pauper 
Phialacanthus wrayi

References

Acanthaceae
Acanthaceae genera